

Introduction
Amarotypines are a small tribe of ground beetles (Carabidae), recognised as a distinct tribe since 1985. The best known species is Amarotypus edwardsii of New Zealand, widely distributed throughout the three main islands, and arboreal in habits.

Biodiversity and distribution
 Genus Amarotypus: New Zealand (1 sp.)
 Genus Migadopiella: Tasmania (2 spp.)
 NOTES: (1) Published taxonomic work on the tribe is currently very limited, and the presence of undescribed taxa in the South Island of New Zealand has been noted; (2) Migadopiella is somewhat provisionally included in Amarotypini

Classification and phylogeny
Previously considered to be migadopines (before 1985), amarotypines are still often treated as forming a monophyletic subfamily Migadopinae with Migadopini, but the phylogeny may be (Amarotypini, (Migadopini, Elaphrini)). Alternatively, Amarotypini may form a clade with Promecognathini, again unrelated to Migadopini, though this possible relationship has been disputed.

Footnotes

References

  2009: A new genus and two new species of the subfamily Migadopinae from Tasmania (Coleoptera: Carabidae). Folia Heyrovskyana (A), 17: 95-103. 
Taxonomy, phylogeny and zoogeography of beetles and ants. Series entomologica, 33  (this volume)  (series) Google books
 ;  2001: Carabidae (Insecta: Coleoptera): catalogue. Fauna of New Zealand, (43)  
 ;  1998: Inferring phylogenetic relationships within Carabidae (Insecta, Coleoptera) from characters of the female reproductive tract. pp. 107–170 in: ; ;  (eds.) Phylogeny and Classification of Caraboidea, XX I.C.E. (1996, Firenze, Italy). Atti Museo Regionale di Scienze Naturali, Torino
 ; ;  2005: Phylogenetic relationships of Dalyat mirabilis Mateu, 2002, with a revised molecular phylogeny of ground beetles (Coleoptera, Carabidae). Journal of zoological systematics and evolutionary research, 43: 284-296.  PDF

Migadopinae